Pirandello is an Italian surname. Notable people with the surname include:

Fausto Pirandello (1899–1975), Italian painter, son of Luigi
Luigi Pirandello (1867–1936), Italian dramatist, novelist, poet, and short story writer 
Stefano Pirandello (1895–1972), Italian dramatist and writer, son of Luigi

Italian-language surnames